Palaquium dasyphyllum is a tree in the family Sapotaceae. The specific epithet dasyphyllum means "thickly hairy leaves".

Description
The bark is dark brown. Inflorescences bear up to 10 flowers.

Distribution and habitat
Palaquium dasyphyllum is endemic to Borneo. Its habitat is mainly in dipterocarp forests above  altitude.

References

dasyphyllum
Endemic flora of Borneo
Plants described in 1909